Stephen Dunn (1939–2021) was an American poet and educator.

Stephen or Steven Dunn may also refer to:

Stephen Dunn (sound engineer) (1894–1980), American sound engineer
Stephen Porter Dunn (1928–1999), American anthropologist
Stephen Troyte Dunn (1868–1938), British botanist
Stephen Dunn (director) (born 1989), Canadian film director
Steve Doll also known as Steven Dunn (1960–2009), American professional wrestler

See also 
Stephen Dunne (disambiguation)
Steve Dunn (disambiguation)
Dunn (surname)